A hot, dust-obscured galaxy, or hot DOG, is a rare type of quasar. The central black hole of such a galaxy emits vast amounts of radiation which heats the infalling dust and gas, releasing infrared light at a rate about 1,000 times as much as the Milky Way, making these some of the most luminous galaxies in the universe. However, the density of the surrounding dust is so great that most of that light is obscured. They also appear to concentrate a much higher proportion of their galactic mass in the central black hole than is observed in normal galaxies.

Researchers believe that hot DOGs may represent a phase of galactic evolution where the central black hole is capturing material at a rate faster than new stars are forming, yet the radiation pressure from that rapid absorption is pushing away much of that surrounding material. The black hole will eventually clear its area of influence of the excessive dust and gas, rendering it a regular, visible galaxy.

These objects were first detected by the Wide-field Infrared Survey Explorer (WISE) in 2010, and only one out of every 3,000 quasars observed by WISE are of this type. Wu et al (2012) refer to these galaxies as "W1W2-dropouts" because they are faint or invisible in WISE W1 (3.4 μm) and W2 (4.6 μm) detection bands.

See also 
 Luminous infrared galaxy

References

External links 
 

2012 in science